Survival Project: Search for the Legendary Orb was a 2D fantasy massively multiplayer online action role-playing game with emphasis on real-time combat and PvP. It was the first game HanbitSoft commercialized and was released in 2003. The International version was also released in 2003 for the 2003 WCG Survival Project Tournament as a Korean Government sponsored game. The international servers were later closed on October 31, 2004 after the partners of the game built up their own localized sites. E-Games Malaysia hosted the English servers from then on, providing many feature updates to the original game. However the Malaysian servers also closed down on March 31, 2007. Lastly, the Korean Server closed down on February 24, 2013.

Gameplay
Survival Project featured various gameplay modes including various PVP and PVE-based game modes, along with quests that could be played alone or with other players. Players could also join guilds.

See also
 HanbitSoft
 Massively multiplayer online role-playing game

References

External links 
 Official Korean website via Internet Archive 
 Official English website via Internet Archive

2003 video games
Inactive massively multiplayer online games
Massively multiplayer online role-playing games
Products and services discontinued in 2013
Video games developed in South Korea
Windows games
Windows-only games
HanbitSoft games